The Courantyne/Corentyne/Corantijn River is a river in northern South America in Suriname and Guyana. It is the longest river in the country and creates the border between Suriname and the East Berbice-Corentyne region of Guyana. 

Its tributaries include Kutari River, Coeroeni River, New River, and Zombie Creek. In Suriname; Kabalebo River, Lucie River, Sipaliwini River, Kutari River.

Course
The river runs through the Guianan moist forests ecoregion.
A ferry service operates between these two towns.

Waterfalls
The Wonotobo Falls, Frederik Willem IV (Anora) Falls, and the King Edward VI Falls are on the Courantyne River. Other falls include the Barrington Brown Falls, the Drios Falls and the Maopityan Falls.

Territorial dispute
Between the upper reaches of the Courantyne, the Upper Courantyne, the Coeroeni and the Koetari rivers lay the controversial Tigri Area claimed by both Suriname and Guyana. The Guyanese–Surinamese border is the Guyanese river bank (the west bank of the river), Suriname regarded the left bank of the Courantyne as a border, but Guyana disputes this and viewed the center of the river as a frontier, based on the Thalweg Doctrine. This conflict, which has been fueled since the colonial era, was solved in 2007 by a verdict by the Hague Arbitration Court, which settles the border between Guyana and Suriname on the left bank of the river, and the river water body belonging to Suriname. The tribunal that defined the maritime boundary between Suriname and Guyana in 2007 confirmed Surinamese sovereignty over the full width of the entire Courantyne River. Suriname has control over all ship traffic from the mouth of the Courantyne.

See also
Corantijn Basin
Borders of Suriname
List of rivers of Guyana
List of rivers of Suriname
List of rivers of the Americas by coastline

References

Rivers of the Tigri Area
Rivers of Suriname
Rivers of Guyana
Guyana–Suriname border
International rivers of South America
Nickerie District
Border rivers